Graffiti6 is a collaboration founded in London in 2009. Made up of Jamie Scott (songwriter and lead vocals) and Tommy "D" Danvers (producer and songwriter). Graffiti6 are known for their "blend of characterful voice and crisp, intricate groove created from an infectious alliance of electric piano and offbeat guitar".

Career

Beginnings
Singer/songwriter Jamie Scott and producer/songwriter TommyD started collaborating in 2008. Both London-based multi-instrumentalists, they began making music together in 2009 under the name Graffiti6. Initially, Scott was considering working with a producer to repackage a solo album, when an A&R executive at Polydor suggested he meet Danvers. Scott introduced Danvers to "an idea...for a folk thing", which would later become the track "Stare Into the Sun", their first collaboration. The track, first done on acoustic guitar, was developed further by Danvers. It was submitted to The Sun newspaper and was chosen as the soundtrack for a TV ad campaign for the newspaper.

Career
Rather than repackage Scott's solo album and have Danvers produce it, the two decided to start writing original material together. The exposure that the duo received through The Sun campaign encouraged them to write and record more material – including "Annie You Save Me", "Free", and "Stone In My Heart" – in addition to some covers.

They decided to put out their own music on their own label. "Stone In My Heart", an EP containing 4 tracks, was released in March 2010 and "Annie You Save Me" was released as a single in July 2010.

The duo released their debut album Colours on their own NWFree Music label in the United Kingdom in October 2010. After signing to Capitol Records in April 2011, a version was released in the United States on 24 January 2012.

Graffiti6 was named New Band of the Day at The Guardian newspaper (UK) and an Artist to Watch at LP33. Their songs have already been used on such shows as Grey's Anatomy, Covert Affairs, Elementary seas. 1, eps. 8, CSI: NY, One Tree Hill, VH1's Basketball Wives,  VH1's Football Wives, Suits, Free Agents, The Secret Circle, the film What to Expect When You're Expecting, the football (soccer) video game FIFA 12 and the rallying video game Dirt 3. They were nominated, the week of 1 November 2010, for mtvU's The Freshman title.

Graffiti6's track "Free" was chosen as iTunes Single of the Week. In March 2012, VH1 picked them for their You Oughta Know Artist on the Rise and VEVO picked them as Lift Artist for April and May 2012. They have also performed internationally at the Summer Well festival in Buftea, Romania. The band was scheduled to perform at the Osheaga Festival in Montreal on August 3, 2012, but dropped out.

They have performed on The Tonight Show with Jay Leno, Conan, Jimmy Kimmel Live! and the Late Show with David Letterman.

A song titled "Wash My Sins" was released on 14 May 2013. "Beside You" was released on 28 October 2013.

Band members
 Jamie Scott - vocals, guitar, keyboards
 TommyD - guitar, vocals
 Pete Cherry - bass, vocals
 Leonn Meade - drums
 Joe Glossop - keyboards

The British artist and illustrator, Jimi Crayon, designs all of Graffiti6's artwork and is responsible for their bold logo and Technicolor visuals.

Discography

Albums

EPs
2010: Stone in My Heart (NWFree Music)
(All songs by Jamie Scott & Tommy D)
"Stone In My Heart" (3:13)
"Foxes" (6:29)
"Starlight" (3:31)
"Stone in My Heart (Acoustic)" (2:51)

Singles

Other releases
2010: "Annie You Save Me"
2012: "Stare Into the Sun"
2014: "You Got the Sunshine"

References

External links
 Official website 

English musical duos
Musical groups established in 2009
Musical groups from London